In November 1554, the Revival of the Heresy Acts (1 & 2 Ph. & M. c.6) revived three former Acts against heresy; the letters patent of 1382 of King Richard II, an Act of 1401 of King Henry IV, and an Act of 1414 of King Henry V. All three of these laws had been repealed under King Henry VIII and King Edward VI.

This Act reflects Queen Mary I's concern for increased heresy and the lack of authority to deal with it. Edward and his father had sponsored the Reformation in stages, but Mary had always been Roman Catholic and considered Protestants to be heretics, and needed this law to pursue her religious policies.

The Act stated its purpose:
For the eschewing and avoiding of errors and heresies, which of late have risen, grown, and much increased within this realm, for that the ordinaries have wanted authority to proceed against those that were infected therewith: be it therefore ordained and enacted by authority of this present Parliament, that the statute made in the fifth year of the reign of King Richard II, concerning the arresting and apprehension of erroneous and heretical preachers, and one other statute made in the second year of the reign of King Henry IV, concerning the repressing of heresies and punishment of heretics, and also one other statute made in the second year of the reign of King Henry V, concerning the suppression of heresy and Lollardy, and every article, branch, and sentence contained in the same three several Acts, and every of them, shall from the twentieth day of January next coming be revived, and be in full force, strength, and effect to all intents, constructions, and purposes for ever.

This Act was repealed in 1559 by section 6 of the second Act of Supremacy.

See also
 First Statute of Repeal

References

External links
 Apparent partial text of the Second Statute of Repeal

Heresy in Christianity
1554 in law
Acts of the Parliament of England concerning religion
16th-century anti-Protestantism
Christianity and law in the 16th century
1554 in England
Repealed English legislation
1554 in Christianity